This is a list of members of the Australian Capital Territory Legislative Assembly from 1975 to 1979. This was the first time this body sat; it was not self-governing at this time.

 Labor MLA Susan Ryan resigned in late 1975 in order to contest the 1975 federal election. John Clements was appointed to the casual vacancy in February 1976.
 Liberal MLA Ray Saunders resigned on 13 October 1976. George Paulus was appointed to the casual vacancy  on 5 November 1976.
 Labor MLA Gordon Walsh resigned in February 1977. Paul Whalan was appointed to the casual vacancy on 23 February 1977.
 Liberal MLA Trevor Kaine resigned in August 1977. Ron Bell was appointed to the casual vacancy on 12 October 1977.
 Peter Hughes resigned from the Liberal Party, of which he had been leader, on 3 January 1977. He subsequently sat as an independent.
 Maureen Worsley resigned from the Australia Party on 30 August 1977 due to her opposition to Don Chipp and the Australian Democrats merger and subsequently sat as an independent.
 In 1977, the Australia Party became the Australian Democrats; Australia Party MLA Ivor Vivian joined the latter party.
 Independent MLA Allan Fraser died on 12 December 1977. Bill Pye was appointed to the casual vacancy on 22 February 1978.

Members of Australian Capital Territory parliaments by term
20th-century Australian politicians